The 1844 United States presidential election in Maryland took place between November 1 and December 4, 1844, as part of the 1844 United States presidential election. Voters chose eight representatives, or electors to the Electoral College, who voted for President and Vice President.

Maryland voted for the Whig candidate, Henry Clay, over Democratic candidate James K. Polk. Clay won Maryland by a margin of 4.78%.

With 52.39% of the popular vote, Maryland would prove to be Henry Clay's fifth strongest state after Rhode Island, Vermont, Kentucky and North Carolina.

Results

Results by county

Counties that flipped from Whig to Democratic
Allegany

Counties that flipped from Democratic to Whig
Carroll

See also
 United States presidential elections in Maryland
 1844 United States presidential election
 1844 United States elections

Notes

References 

Maryland
1844
Presidential